The second Ro-56 was an Imperial Japanese Navy Kaichū type submarine of the K6 sub-class. Completed and commissioned in November 1944, she served in World War II and was sunk during her first war patrol in April 1945.

Design and description
The submarines of the K6 sub-class were versions of the preceding K5 sub-class with greater range and diving depth. They displaced  surfaced and  submerged.

For surface running, the boats were powered by two  diesel engines, each driving one propeller shaft. When submerged each propeller was driven by a  electric motor. They could reach  on the surface and  underwater.

The boats were armed with four internal bow  torpedo tubes and carried a total of ten torpedoes. They were also armed with a single  L/40 anti-aircraft gun and two single  AA guns.

Construction and commissioning

Submarine No. 645 was laid down on 2 December 1943 by Mitsui Zosensho at Tamano, Japan, with the provisional name Ro-75. She had been renamed Ro-56 — the second submarine of that name — by the time she was launched on 5 July 1944. She was completed and commissioned on 15 November 1944.

Service history
Upon commissioning, Ro-56 was attached to the Maizuru Naval District and assigned to Submarine Squadron 11 for workups. She was reassigned to Submarine Division 34 in the 6th Fleet on 10 February 1945. She arrived at Saeki, Japan, on 16 March 1945.

First war patrol

She reported on 22 March 1945 that she had reached her patrol area. While she was at sea, the Battle of Okinawa began with the U.S. landings on Okinawa on 1 April 1945.

Loss
Monssen dropped three patterns of depth charges, after which Mertz joined the attack and dropped another three patterns.

The submarine Monssen and Mertz sank probably was Ro-56. On 15 April 1945, the Imperial Japanese Navy declared her to be presumed lost off Okinawa with all 79 men on board. The Japanese struck her from the Navy list on 25 May 1945.

Some accounts claim that the U.S. submarine  sank Ro-56 northeast of Wake Island on 18 April 1945, but Ro-56 never operated near Wake. The submarine Sea Owl attacked was  — and I-372 survived the attack.

Notes

References
 

 

Ro-35-class submarines
Kaichū type submarines
Ships built by Mitsui Engineering and Shipbuilding
1944 ships
World War II submarines of Japan
Japanese submarines lost during World War II
World War II shipwrecks in the East China Sea
Maritime incidents in April 1945
Ships lost with all hands
Submarines sunk by United States warships